Sassafras is an unincorporated community in Clark Township, Perry County, in the U.S. state of Indiana.

History
A post office called Sassafras was established in 1916, and remained in operation until it was discontinued in 1957. The community was named for a grove of sassafras trees near the original town site.

Geography

References

Unincorporated communities in Perry County, Indiana
Unincorporated communities in Indiana